Chilo ingloriellus is a moth in the family Crambidae. It was described by Heinrich Benno Möschler in 1882. It is found in Suriname.

References

Chiloini
Moths described in 1882